Gordon Lee Memorial High School (GLHS) is a four-year public high school located in Chickamauga, Georgia, United States. It is part of the Chickamauga City School District, which serves the City of Chickamauga in Walker County.

History
The late Gordon Lee of Chickamauga left a grant of a plot of land and enough money to start the school.

The first graduation consisted of one student, Leon Wiley, in 1917.

The Main Building, Olive Lee Building, and Tom Lee Building were constructed in 1930.

The Ware-Jewell Activities Center holds a gymnasium, classrooms, and a technology lab. The center also harbors the Arthur Yates Building, which contains math and science classrooms.

Since 1991, Gordon Lee High School and Gordon Lee Middle School have shared a band room and cafeteria.

Construction of an extension to the gymnasium which includes new classrooms was completed during the 2013-2014 school year.

In August 2016, construction began to build a new school building.

Demographics
White: 98.3%, Asian: 0%, Hispanic: 0.6%, Black: 0%, Two or More Races: 1.1%, American Indian: 0%.

Athletics
The Gordon Lee Trojans compete in the 6-A GHSA Conference. Gordon Lee has the following sports teams.

Baseball
Basketball
Bass Fishing
Cheerleading
Cross Country
Football
Golf
Softball
Tennis
Track
Volleyball
Wrestling

Notable alumni
 Jeff Mullis - Georgia state senator
 Steve Tarvin - Georgia state representative

References

External links

Schools in Walker County, Georgia
Public high schools in Georgia (U.S. state)